Kaunia is an upazila of Rangpur District in the Division of Rangpur, Bangladesh.

Geography
It has 35487 households and total area 147.6 km2. Tista river flows beside this upazila.

Kaunia Upazila (Rangpur District) with an area of 147.6 km2, is bounded by Gangachara and Lalmonirhat sadar upazilas on the north, Pirgachha upazila on the south, Rajarhat upazila on the east, Rangpur sadar upazila on the west. Main rivers are Tista, Burail.

Demographics
As of the 1991 Bangladesh census, Kaunia has a population of 184997. Males constitute 51.26% of the population, and females 48.74%. This Upazila's eighteen up population is 88987.52.5% male and 47.5% female. Kaunia has an average literacy rate of 22.7% (7+ years), and the national average of 32.4% literate.

Economy
Agriculture is the main economical root of maximum people of this Upazila.

Administration
Kaunia Upazila is divided into Kaunia Municipality and six union parishads: Balapara, Haragach, Kursha, Sarai, Shahidbag, and Tepamodhupur. The union parishads are subdivided into 80 mauzas and 78 villages.

Kaunia (Main Town) consists of three mouzas (Harishwar, Nizpara and). It has an area of 6.49 km2. The town has a population of 11125; male 52.5%, female 47.5%. The density of population is per km2 1714.

Education
The people of Kaunia are developed in educational sector. About 90% people are educated. There are many educational institutions.Such as
 Kaunia M.H. Government Model High School
 Kaunia Girls High School
 Kaunia College
 Kaunia Mohila College
 Nijpara Ahammadia Senior Madrasah
 Sabdi darus sunnah alim madrasah
 Daradi High School etc.

It is said that Kaunia College is one of the best colleges in Rangpur district.

See also
Upazilas of Bangladesh
Districts of Bangladesh
Divisions of Bangladesh

References

Upazilas of Rangpur District